Alexandre Vanhoutte (born 18 July 1974) is a French bobsledder. He competed in the four man event at the 2006 Winter Olympics.

References

1974 births
Living people
French male bobsledders
Olympic bobsledders of France
Bobsledders at the 2006 Winter Olympics
People from Croix, Nord
Sportspeople from Nord (French department)